Giddens is both a surname and a given name. Notable people with the name include:

Surname
Anthony Giddens, Baron Giddens (born 1938), British sociologist
George Giddens (disambiguation), multiple people
J. R. Giddens (born 1985), American basketball player
Rhiannon Giddens (born 1977), American musician

Given name
Giddens Ko (born 1978), Taiwanese writer

See also
Gary Giddins (born 1948), American writer and jazz critic